Cruel Guards is the third studio album by Australian indie rock band, The Panics. It was released on 13 October 2007 by Dew Process. The album debuted and peaked at number 18 on the ARIA Charts and was certified gold in 2008.

The album was Triple J's feature album for the week of 8 October 2007. At the J Awards of 2007, the album won Australian Album of the Year. Drew Wootton said "It was amazing to win that award. We celebrated for days with the Triple J staff and then just fell over."

At the ARIA Music Awards of 2008, the album won the ARIA Award for Best Adult Contemporary Album while Scott Horscroft was nominated for ARIA Award for Producer of the Year and Engineer the Year.

Reception

Adam Greenberg from AllMusic said "Frontman Jae Laffer gives a husky delivery that swoons just a bit here and there over the top of a layer of guitar and drums, an occasional bit of keyboard inflection, and depending on the song, a bit of classic Motown-style strings." Greenberg continued "The band tells their stories, touching on the grey areas of pop, alluding to U2 in the rhythm guitar for a moment in 'Live Without'. They touch on darker beach songs in 'Confess', they evoke contemporary Bob Dylan recordings in 'Sundowner' with an almost weary, dim delivery but a grandiose chorus movement. The album defies a clear definition other than 'adult contemporary' but it's attractive, it's catchy, and it's exploratory all at once. Definitely worth a spin or two."

Track listing 
 Standard Edition
All tracks written by Jae Laffer, Paul Otway, Drew Wootton, Myles Wootton and Julian Grigor.
 "Get Us Home" – 4:16
 "Ruins" – 3:42
 "Creaks" – 4:02
 "Don't Fight It" – 5:01
 "Feeling is Gone" – 3:23
 "Cruel Guards" – 5:15
 "Live Without" – 4:17
 "Something in the Garden" – 4:57
 "Confess" – 3:49
 "Sundowner" – 5:18
 "My Best Mistake" (iTunes bonus track) – 3:13
 "In Your Head" (iTunes bonus track) – 4:02
 "Cash" (iTunes bonus track) – 4:15
 "Kid You're a Dreamer" (iTunes bonus track) – 3:20

Bonus EP

Limited copies of the CD included a bonus EP of covers called Join the Dots.
 "Lazyitis" (Mark Day, Paul Davis, Paul Ryder, Gary Whelan, Shaun Ryder, John Lennon, Paul McCartney, Sly Stone, David Essex) - 3:56
 "One Too Many Mornings" (Bob Dylan) – 2:28
 "Factory Girl" (Mick Jagger, Keith Richards) – 2:31
 "Who By Fire" (Leonard Cohen) – 3:04
 "Just Like a Woman" (Dylan) – 4:47

Personnel 
The Panics
 Jae Laffer – vocals, guitar, piano, harmonica
 Myles Wootton – drums, percussion, vocals, orchestral arrangements
 Jules Douglas – guitar, piano, vocals, hammond organ
 Drew Wootton – guitar
 Paul Otway – bass, vocals

Additional musicians
 Naomi Radom – strings
 Simon Ferenci – trumpet

Charts

Certifications

Release history

References

2007 albums
The Panics albums
Dew Process albums
ARIA Award-winning albums